TÜLOMSAŞ is a locomotive and wagon builder in Turkey. It is the main locomotive supplier of the Turkish State Railways and is one of the 2 companies that designs and assembles locomotives in Turkey along with EUROTEM. TÜLOMSAŞ is the largest company in Turkey in rail transport. The company headquarters and factory are located in Eskişehir.

The company builds GE PowerHaul locomotives under a partnership with GE Transportation.

See also
 Devrim

Gallery

References

Locomotive manufacturers of Turkey
Rail vehicle manufacturers of Turkey
Turkish brands
Vehicle manufacturing companies established in 1894
1894 establishments in the Ottoman Empire
Companies based in Eskişehir